Good Vibes: Remixes is a Ladislav Lučenič (also known as Double L) project that featured fourteen compositions by major Slovak artists, such as Marika Gombitová ("Domy na zbúranie", "V období dažďa"), Elán ("Poďme sa báť"), Pavol Habera and TEAM ("Som v tom", "Výsluch svedomia") and Prúdy ("Poď so mnou"). The set was released on PolyGram Slovakia in 1997.

For the production of the album, Lučenič received the ZAI Award '97 as the Best Producer His additional productions included "Klik-klak" by  I.M.T. Smile, and "Tomorrow"/The Same Mist Here by Karol Mikloš.

Track listing

Official releases
 1997: Good Vibes: Remixes, CD, PolyGram Slovakia, #539 531

Credits and personnel

 Laco Lučenič - writer, remix
 TEAM - performer
 Modus - performer
 Marika Gombitová - writer, lead vocal
 Ibrahim Maiga - writer, lead vocal
 Prúdy - performer
 Beáta Dubasová - lead vocal
 Elán - performer
 Pavol Habera - writer, lead vocal

 Dušan Antalík - writer
 Ján Lehotský - writer, performer
 Marián Varga - writer
 Václav Patejdl - writer
 Pavol Jursa - lyrics
 Kamil Peteraj - lyrics
 Rudolf Skukálek - lyrics
 Boris Filan - lyrics
 Peter Uličný - lyrics

See also
 Marika Gombitová discography
 Marika Gombitová awards
 The 100 Greatest Slovak Albums of All Time

References

General

Specific

External links 
 

1997 remix albums
Compilation albums by Slovak artists